An S-duct (or serpentine inlet) is a type of jet engine intake duct used in several types of trijet aircraft. In this configuration, the intake is in the upper rear center of the aircraft, above or below the stabilizer, while the exhaust and engine is at the rear of the aircraft.  The S-duct is located in the tail, or empennage, of the aircraft.  The shape of the S-duct is distinctive and easily recognized, and was used in several aircraft, beginning in 1962 with the Hawker Siddeley Trident.  Currently, the Dassault Falcon 8X and Dassault Falcon 900 business jets are the only aircraft in production that use the S-duct design.

Benefits and drawbacks 
The S-duct was invented as a solution for positioning the central engine on trijets.  The S-duct was easier to service than alternative trijet designs.  Most trijet designs opted for the S-duct layout. Only the McDonnell Douglas DC-10 and MD-11 trijets' designers chose not to use the S-duct and go with a "straight-through" layout. The straight-through layout leaves the engine high above the ground, making access difficult.  The straight-through layout also increases total aircraft aerodynamic drag by 2–4%.

Compared to the straight-through design on the DC-10 and MD-11, the S-duct allows a shorter fin and a rudder closer to the longitudinal axis.

On the Lockheed L-1011 TriStar, engineers were able to maintain engine performance comparable with straight-through designs by limiting the curve of the S-duct to less than a quarter of the radius of the engine intake diameter. The S-duct design also reduced the total empty aircraft weight. The research undertaken during the design of the L-1011 indicated that losses of using an S-duct were more than compensated for by the above savings.

The S-shaped duct is a complicated and costly design. Since modern jet engines have more power and reliability than those of the 1970s and can safely power the aircraft with only two engines, the trijet design is no longer used for large commercial airliners but is used on the latest Dassault Falcon 7X and Falcon 8X business jets in order to provide significantly more total thrust while enabling the continued use of smaller engines in the 15-30kN class that all Falcons have historically been designed with. In international aviation regulations the triple engine layout is also considered inherently safer for the increased redundancy and this allows the use of certain airfields at high elevation only for aircraft with more than two engines.

The S-duct also finds use on combat aircraft, where it has the important advantage of blocking the front of the jet engine from radar. The spinning compressor blades would produce a strong radar return, compared to the smooth sides of the duct.

List of S-duct aircraft

Aircraft currently built with S-ducts are the:

Dassault Falcon 7X
Dassault Falcon 900
Dassault Rafale
Eurofighter Typhoon
Lockheed Martin F-35 Lightning II

Aircraft previously built with S-ducts, but no longer in production, are the:

Boeing 727
Dassault Falcon 50
Epic Victory
Hawker Siddeley Trident
IAI Lavi (inverse S-duct, with underside intake and the nozzles on upper fuselage)
Lockheed L-1011 TriStar
Lockheed Martin F-22 Raptor
Lockheed YF-22
Mikoyan Project 1.44
Northrop Grumman B-2 Spirit
Northrop YF-23 (inverse S-duct)
Short SC.1
Sukhoi Su-47
Tupolev Tu-154
Tupolev Tu-154M
Yakovlev Yak-40
Yakovlev Yak-42

The Boeing 747-300 Trijet (not to be confused with the later 747-300) was designed with an S-duct layout, but never built.

References

Aircraft propulsion components
Aircraft configurations